Uncaria guianensis, the cat's claw, is a plant species in the genus Uncaria found in the Amazon biome. Other names for the plant include uña de gato, Paraguayo and vincaria.

Uncaria guianensis contains many phytochemicals ((-)-epicatechin, alkaloid, beta-Sitosterol, campesterol, campherol, catechol, catechutannic acid, chlorogenic acid, ellagic acid, gallic acid, hyperin, oleanolic acid, rutin, stigmasterol, ursolic acid) and proanthocyanidin B1 and proanthocyanidin B2, B type proanthocyanidins, in the root.

References

External links
 
 

guianensis